Basketball Club "BC" Caspiy Aktau is a Kazakhstani professional basketball club based in the city of Aktau in western Kazakhstan.

History
BC Caspiy was founded in April 2008 by the municipality of Mangystau province.

Roster

Titles
Kazakhstan Basketball Championship:
Bronze: 2011-12, 2012–13, 2013–14, 2014-15 
Kazakhstan Basketball Cup: 
Bronze: 2011-12, 2012–13

References and notes

External links

Basketball teams established in 2008
Basketball teams in Kazakhstan